This list outlines the Landeshauptmen of the Crownland Duchy of Bukovina at the time of the reign of the Habsburg Empire.

Landeshauptmann of Bucovina 
 Eugenie Hacman (1861–1862)
 Eudoxiu Hurmuzachi (1862–1870)
 Alexander Wassilko von Serecki (1870–1871)
 Eudoxiu Hurmuzachi (1871–1874)
 Anton Kochanowski von Stawczan (1874–1884)
 Alexander Wassilko von Serecki  (1884–1892)
 Ioan Lupul (1892–1904)
 Georg Wassilko von Serecki (1904–1911)
 Alexandru Hurmuzachi (1911–1918)

Gallery

Notes 

Bukovina
Politicians of Bukovina